Michal Dvořák (born 12 August 1979) is a former Czech professional ice hockey player. He played for HC Plzeň in the Czech Extraliga during most of his career.

Dvořák previously played for HC Olomouc, Kitchener Rangers and HC Energie Karlovy Vary.

References

External links 
 
 

1979 births
Living people
Czech ice hockey forwards
HC Plzeň players
HC Karlovy Vary players
People from Šternberk
Sportspeople from the Olomouc Region
Essen Mosquitoes players
Czech expatriate ice hockey players in Canada
Czech expatriate ice hockey players in Germany